Toni Golem (born 14 January 1982) is a Croatian retired professional footballer who played as centre or right back on defence. He currently is manager of club Solin.

Managerial career
After retiring in 2012, Golem began his coaching career at his former club, Hrvatski Dragovoljac. He signed a contract until June 2014. He worked in the staff until just before the summer 2017. He then joined the staff of manager Željko Kopić in Slaven Belupo, functioning as an assistant coach.

On 13 November 2018, Željko Kopić was appointed as the new manager of Hajduk Split, where Golem followed with him, remaining as his assistant. In the end of November 2017, Golem finished his UEFA Pro Licence. Golem left Hajduk in the summer 2018.

On 3 January 2019, Golem became the manager of Balmazújvárosi FC in the Nemzeti Bajnokság II and in July that year he took over at Lučko.

During his spell as assistant coach in Hajduk Toni was in charge of the first team as Head coach when the manager was sacked. He led the Hajduk Split team in three games. 

When Toni worked as an assistant coach his second time in Hajduk Split he was the right hand of Paolo Tramezzani who in the past was the manager of Livorno in Serie A, and APOEL in Cyprus as well as Switzerland first division teams like Sion and Lugano. In addition he has also worked for Boro Primorac who was the assistant coach of Arsene Wenger for over 20  years in Arsenal.

In February 2022, he was appointed manager of Croatian second tier-side NK Solin.

References

External links
 
 

1982 births
Living people
Footballers from Split, Croatia
Association football defenders
Croatian footballers
NK Mosor players
NK Hrvatski Dragovoljac players
Górnik Łęczna players
Ruch Chorzów players
NK Inter Zaprešić players
NK Karlovac players
Croatian expatriate footballers
Expatriate footballers in Poland
Croatian expatriate sportspeople in Poland
Croatian football managers
Balmazújvárosi FC managers
NK Lučko managers
NK Solin managers
Expatriate football managers in Hungary
Croatian expatriate sportspeople in Hungary
Croatian expatriate sportspeople in Iran
HNK Hajduk Split non-playing staff